María Isabel Riquelme de la Barrera y Meza (1758 – April 21, 1839), was the mother of Chilean independence leader Bernardo O'Higgins. Isabel Riquelme was of Basque descent.

She was born in Chillán, the second daughter of Simón Riquelme de la Barrera y Goycochea and of María Mercedes de Mesa y Ulloa. At the age of 19, she became pregnant by 58-year-old Ambrosio O'Higgins, Marquis of Osorno, future viceroy of Peru.

She married twice, first in 1780 to Félix Rodríguez y Rojas, by whom she had a daughter, Rosa Rodríguez y Riquelme (Chillán, August 30, 1781 – Lima, 1850). Her husband died in 1782, and she married her second husband, Manuel de Puga y Figueroa, by whom she had another daughter named Maria de las Nieves de Puga y Riquelme in 1793.

References

Chilean expatriates in Peru
Chilean people of Basque descent
People from Chillán
First ladies of Chile
1839 deaths
1758 births
19th-century Chilean people